Linda Jeffers Coombs is an author and historian from the Wampanoag Tribe of Gay Head (Aquinnah). Coombs is the former program director of the Aquinnah Cultural Center.

Career 
Coombs began a museum career in 1974, interning at the Boston Children's Museum as part of its Native American Program.  She and her peers, including Narragansett elder Paulla Dove Jennings, wrote children's books for the museum, illustrating Native American culture from a Native American perspective.  Coombs later worked for nearly three decades with the Wampanoag Indigenous Program at Plimoth Plantation, including 15 years as the program's associate director. In that capacity, she wrote a number of essays documenting colonial history from a Native American perspective, and often spoke publicly about the need for more accurate representations of colonial events including the first Thanksgiving and Columbus Day.

Coombs serves as program director of the Aquinnah Cultural Center, continuing to educate the public about Wampanoag history, culture, and other contributions. Valued for her expertise in regional Native American history, Coombs is a frequent consultant on scholarly and educational projects.

Born and raised in Martha's Vineyard, Coombs lives with her family in the Wampanoag Community in Mashpee on Cape Cod.

Publications
"A Wampanoag Perspective on Colonial House."Plimoth Life, v.3 no. 1, 2004: 24-28.
"Hobbamock’s Homesite." Thanks, But No Thanks: Mirroring the Myth: Native Perspectives on Thanksgiving. Plymouth, MA: Wampanoag Indian Program.  September 9, 2000: 2-3.
"Holistic History."  Plimoth Life 1(2) 2002:12-15.
"Mayflower: A Story of Courage, Community and War by Nathaniel Philbrick [review]."  " Cultural Survival Quarterly, Spring 2007.
"New Woodland Path Makes Inroads at Wampanoag Homesite." Plimoth Life, v. 5 no. 1, 2006: 20.Powwow.  Modern Curriculum Press, 1992.
"Wampanoag Foodways in the 17th Century." Plimoth Life'' 2005: 13-19

References

External links
Art by Linda Coombs on exhibit at the University of New Hampshire
Linda Coombs speaking about Thanksgiving in 2010 at Boston City Hall 
2010 Documentary about King Philip's War, in which Linda Coombs appears

Living people
Year of birth missing (living people)
Native American writers
20th-century Native American women
20th-century Native Americans
Historians of Native Americans
Wampanoag Tribe of Gay Head people
Native American women writers
People from Aquinnah, Massachusetts
Historians from Massachusetts
American women historians
21st-century Native Americans
21st-century Native American women
Native American people from Massachusetts
Writers from Massachusetts
21st-century American women writers
21st-century American historians